Mike Cochrane is a musician and an actor. Cochrane played in bands such as Train, Shango and many other bands in the 1970s. Mike's band Train was the "House Band" at Gazzarris on the Sunset Strip from 1971 through 1972. This is where Mike met Edward James Olmos and Rick Vito, who were in a band called "The Pacific Ocean".  Mike also played on many recording sessions for Warner Bros. in the 70s and also played with Tim Bogert and Mickey McMeel in a power trio for a while. Mike also did his first acting job as a second engineer in the movie The Rose with Bette Midler and Alan Bates.

In the 80's, Mike continued to play in bands including, Exhibit A, The Zone, Craby Appleton (With Michael Fennelly), Spencer Davis, UXB, Reach, and a couple of new versions of Train, as well as continuing to do studio work.

Mike is now acting and can be seen on such shows as My Name Is Earl, Dexter, CSI: Crime Scene Investigation, The Riches, Monk, ER, Weeds, Moonlight,CSI: NY, Flaked, and is currently shooting season 9 of HBO's Shameless, where he's been a regular in the Alibi since season 2. He also can be seen in the movies Beerfest, Blades of Glory, Epic Movie, Spider-Man 3, Hancock and Iron Man.

External links

Mike's website

American male film actors
American male television actors
American rock musicians
Living people
Year of birth missing (living people)